Collier Twentyman Smithers (1867 – 7 December 1943) was a portrait, figure and rustic painter.  He was born in Buenos Aires, the son of Arthur Edward Smithers, a banker.

In 1892 Smithers was living at 5 Primrose Hill Studios off Fitzroy Road, north London.  This may account for his stylistic similarity to John William Waterhouse, who also lived at Primrose Hill Studios.

From 1892 to 1936 he exhibited at the Royal Academy; the Royal Society of British Artists, Birmingham; Walker Art Gallery, Liverpool; Manchester City Art Gallery; New Gallery; and the Royal Hibernian Academy and his work received popular reviews. He was a Freeman of the City of London, being admitted to the Worshipful Company of Turners in 1893.

He died in 1943 at 36 Roland Gardens, London.

Paintings
R. Norman Shaw, Esq., R.A.—1892
Surg.-Lieut. Leopold Hudson, Duke of Cambridge's Hussars—1894
A Race with Mermaids and Tritons—1895
The Theft of the Princess's Swan Skin—1896
Angel of Fortune—1901
Walking up grouse (photogravure)—1904
Portrait of Joan Helen Furneaux Dawson—1913
The princess permits—1915
Portrait of Adam Alexander Dawson—1918

References
Royal Academy Exhibitors, 1905–1970, vol VI.
Dictionary of British Artists, 1880-1940.
The Dictionary of Portrait Painters in Britain up to 1920, by Stewart and Cutten.
"The New Gallery - Reviews," The Times, Monday May 18, 1896, page 6, issue 34893, column A.

1867 births
1943 deaths
People from Buenos Aires
Argentine people of English descent
19th-century English painters
English male painters
20th-century English painters
Modern painters
British people of Argentine descent
19th-century English male artists
20th-century English male artists